Films made in the 2000s featuring the character of James Bond included Die Another Day, Casino Royale, and Quantum of Solace.

Die Another Day (2002)
Principal photography of Die Another Day began on 11 January 2002 at Pinewood studios. The film was shot primarily in the United Kingdom, Iceland, and Cádiz, Spain. Other locations included Pinewood Studios' historic 007 Stage, and scenes shot in Maui, Hawaii, in December 2001.
Laird Hamilton, Dave Kalama, and Darrick Doerner performed the pre-title surfing scene at the surf break known as Jaws in Peahi, Maui, while the shore shots were taken near Cádiz and Newquay, Cornwall. Scenes inside Graves' diamond mine were also filmed in Cornwall, at the Eden Project. The scenes involving the Cuban locations Havana and the fictional Isla Los Organos were filmed at La Caleta, Spain.

The scenes featuring Berry in a bikini were shot in Cádiz; the location was reportedly cold and windy, and footage has been released of Berry wrapped in thick towels between takes to avoid catching a chill. Berry was injured during filming when debris from a smoke grenade flew into her eye. The debris was removed in a 30-minute operation.

Gadgets and other props from every previous Bond film and stored in Eon Productions' archives appear in Q's warehouse in the London Underground. Examples include the jetpack in Thunderball and Rosa Klebb's poison-tipped shoe in From Russia with Love. Q mentions that the watch he issues Bond is "your 20th, I believe", a reference to Die Another Day being the 20th Eon-produced Bond film. In London, the Reform Club was used to shoot several places in the film, including the lobby at the Blades Club, MI6 Headquarters, Buckingham Palace, Green Park, and Westminster. Svalbard, Norway and Jökulsárlón, Iceland were used for the car chase on the ice with additional scenes filmed at Jostedalsbreen National Park, Norway and RAF Little Rissington, Gloucestershire.

The scene where Bond surfs the wave that Icarus created when Graves was trying to kill Bond was shot on the blue screen. The waves and all of the glaciers in the scene were digitally produced.

The hangar interior of the "US Air Base in South Korea", shown crowded with Chinook helicopters, was filmed at RAF Odiham in Hampshire, UK, as were the helicopter interior shots during the Switchblade sequence although this took place entirely on the ground with the sky background being added in post-production using blue screen techniques. Although in the plot the base is American, in reality all the aircraft and personnel in the shot are British. In the film, a Switchblade (one-man glider shaped like a fighter jet) is used by Bond and Jinx to enter North Korea undetected. The Switchblade was based on a workable model called "PHASST" (Programmable High Altitude Single Soldier Transport). Kinetic Aerospace Inc.'s lead designer, Jack McCornack was impressed by director Lee Tamahori's way of conducting the Switchblade scene and said, "It's brief, but realistic. The good guys get in unobserved, thanks to a fast cruise, good glide performance, and minimal radar signature. It's a wonderful promotion for the PHASST." Also, Graves' plane was a  model that was controlled by a computer. When the plane flew through the Icarus beam, engineers cut the plane away piece by piece so that it looked like it was burning and falling apart.

The sex scene between Bond and Jinx—the first time onscreen in the series in which Bond is depicted actually having sex as opposed to a post-coital scenario—had to be trimmed for the American market. An early cut of Die Another Day featured a brief moment—seven seconds in length—in which Jinx is heard moaning strongly. The MPAA ordered that the scene be trimmed so that Die Another Day could get the expected PG-13 rating. The scene was cut as requested, earning the film a PG-13 rating for "action violence and sexuality."

Casino Royale (2006)

Principal photography for Casino Royale commenced on 3 January 2006 and concluded on 20 July 2006. The film was primarily shot at Barrandov Studios in Prague, with additional location shooting in the Bahamas, Italy and the United Kingdom. The shoot concluded at Pinewood Studios.

Initially, Michael G. Wilson confirmed that Casino Royale would either be filmed or take place in Prague and South Africa. However, Eon Productions encountered problems in securing film locations in South Africa. After no other locations became available, the producers had to reconsider their options. In September 2005, Martin Campbell and director of photography Phil Meheux were scouting Paradise Island in the Bahamas as a possible location for the film. On 6 October 2005, Martin Campbell confirmed that Casino Royale would film in the Bahamas and "maybe Italy". In addition to the extensive location filming, studio work including choreography and stunt coordination practice was performed at the Barrandov Studios in Prague and at Pinewood Studios where the film used several stages as well as the paddock tank and the historic 007 Stage. Further shooting in the UK was scheduled for Dunsfold Aerodrome in Surrey, the cricket pavilion at Eton College (although that particular scene was cut from the completed movie) and the Millbrook Vehicle Proving Ground in Bedfordshire.

After Prague, the production moved to the Bahamas. Several locations around New Providence were used for filming during February and March, particularly on Paradise Island. Footage set in Mbale, Uganda, was filmed at Black Park, a Country Park in Buckinghamshire, on 4 July 2006. Additional scenes took place at Albany House, an estate owned by golfers Ernie Els and Tiger Woods. The crew returned to the Czech Republic in April, and continued there, filming in Prague, Planá and Loket, before completing in the town of Karlovy Vary in May. A famous Czech spa, Karlovy Vary, in German known as the Karlsbad, was used as the exterior of the Casino Royale, with the Grandhotel Pupp serving as "Hotel Splendide". The main Italian location was Venice, where the majority of the film's ending is set. Other scenes in the latter half of the film were shot in late May and early June at the Villa del Balbianello on the shores of Lake Como. Further exterior shooting for the movie took place at properties such as the Villa la Gaeta, near the lakeside town of Menaggio.

A recreation of the Body Worlds exhibit provided a setting for one scene in the film. Among the Body Worlds plastinates featured in that scene were the Poker Playing Trio (which plays a key role in one scene) and Rearing Horse and Rider. The exhibition's developer and promoter, German anatomist Gunther von Hagens, also has a cameo appearance in the film, although only his trademark hat is actually visible on screen.

On 30 July 2006, a fire broke out at the 007 Stage. The damage was significant, but had no effect on the release of Casino Royale as the incident occurred one week after filming had been completed, and the sets were in the process of being dismantled. On 11 August 2006, Pinewood Studios confirmed that no attempt would be made to salvage the remains of the stage; instead it would be rebuilt from scratch.

Quantum of Solace (2008)
Quantum of Solace was shot in six countries. Second unit filming began in Italy at the Palio di Siena horse race on 16 August 2007: although at this point Forster was unsure how it would fit into the film. Some scenes were filmed also in Maratea and Craco, two small distinctive towns in Basilicata in southern Italy. Other places used for location shooting were Madrid in August 2007; Baja California, Mexico in early 2008, for shots of the aerial battle; Malcesine, Limone sul Garda and Tremosine in Italy during March, and at Talamone during the end of April. The main unit began on 3 January 2008, at Pinewood Studios. The 007 Stage was used for the fight in the art gallery, and an MI6 safehouse hidden within the city's cisterns, while other stages housed Bond's Bolivian hotel suite, and the MI6 headquarters. Interior and exterior airport scenes were filmed at Farnborough Airfield and the snowy closing scenes were filmed at the Bruneval Barracks in Aldershot.

Shooting in Panama City began on 7 February 2008 at Howard Air Force Base. The country doubled for Haiti and Bolivia, with the National Institute of Culture of Panama standing in for a hotel in the latter country. A sequence requiring several hundred extras was also shot at nearby Colón. Shooting in Panama was also carried out at Fort Sherman, a former US military base on the Colón coast. Forster was disappointed he could only shoot the boat chase in that harbour, as he had a more spectacular vision for the scene. Officials in the country worked with the locals to "minimise inconvenience" for the cast and crew, and in return hoped the city's exposure in the film would increase tourism. The crew was going to move to Cusco, Peru for ten days of filming on 2 March, but the location was cancelled for budget reasons. Twelve days of filming in Chile began on 24 March at Antofagasta. There was shooting in Cobija, the Paranal Observatory, and other locations in the Atacama Desert. Forster chose the desert and the observatory's ESO Hotel to represent Bond's rigid emotions, and being on the verge of committing a vengeful act as he confronts Greene in the film's climax.

While filming in Sierra Gorda, Chile, the local mayor, Carlos Lopez, staged a protest because he was angry at the filmmakers' portrayal of the Antofagasta region as part of Bolivia. He was arrested, detained briefly, and put on trial two days later. Eon dismissed his claim that they needed his permission to film in the area. Michael G. Wilson also explained Bolivia was appropriate to the plot, because of the country's history of water problems, and was surprised the two countries disliked each other a century after the War of the Pacific. In a poll by Chilean daily newspaper La Segunda, 75% of its readers disagreed with Lopez's actions, due to the negative image they felt it presented of Chile, and the controversy's potential to put off productions looking to film in the country in the future.

From 4–12 April, the main unit shot on Sienese rooftops. Shooting on the real rooftops turned out to be less expensive than building them at Pinewood. The next four weeks were scheduled for filming the car chase at Lake Garda and Carrara. On 19 April, an Aston Martin employee driving a DBS to the set crashed into the lake. He survived, and was fined £400 for reckless driving. Another accident occurred on 21 April, and two days later, two stuntmen were seriously injured, with one, Greek stuntman Aris Comninos, having to be put in intensive care. Filming of the scenes was temporarily halted so that Italian police could investigate the causes of the accidents. Stunt co-ordinator Gary Powell said the accidents were a testament to the realism of the action. Rumours of a "curse" spread among tabloid media, something which deeply offended Craig, who disliked that they compared Comninos' accident to something like his minor finger injury later on the shoot (also part of the "curse"). Comninos recovered safely from his injury.

Filming took place at the floating opera stage at Bregenz, Austria, from 28 April – 9 May 2008. The sequence, where Bond stalks the villains during a performance of Tosca, required 1500 extras. The production used a large model of an eye, which Forster felt fitted in the Bond style, and the opera itself has parallels to the film. A short driving sequence was filmed at the nearby Feldkirch, Vorarlberg. The crew returned to Italy from 13 to 17 May to shoot a (planned) car crash at the marble quarry in Carrara, and a recreation of the Palio di Siena at the Piazza del Campo in Siena. 1000 extras were hired for a scene where Bond emerges from the Fonte Gaia. Originally, he would have emerged from the city's cisterns at Siena Cathedral, but this was thought disrespectful. By June, the crew returned to Pinewood for four weeks, where new sets (including the interior of the hotel in the climax) were built. The wrap party was held on 21 June.

Reception table

References

James Bond in film
2000s in film
2000s in British cinema